Making Fiends is a Flash cartoon series by Amy Winfrey. It follows the interactions between Vendetta, a villainous girl that regularly makes monsters called "fiends", and Charlotte, a cheerful and gullible girl who thinks that Vendetta is her best friend. Charlotte unintentionally irritates and annoys Vendetta. As a result, Vendetta attempts to assassinate her with fiends, but she always fails due to Charlotte's luck.

The site was first put up on June 3, 2003, and the series debuted with its first episode on July 14, 2003. In 2004, the series was licensed by Nickelodeon, and eventually the episodes were broadcast on TurboNick. The series would later be uploaded to Amy Winfrey's YouTube page in 2012 in remastered HD quality. A 30-minute animated horror comedy cartoon television series was greenlit in 2008 on Nicktoons Network, which aired only 6 episodes each before being cancelled. Nickelodeon Animation Studio, Cyber Chicken Animation Studio and DQ Entertainment Limited all televised the TV show.

Characters

Vendetta: (Voiced by Aglaia Mortcheva) Vendetta is a sociopathic, narcissistic and histrionic young girl with the power to create "fiends" with a book of recipes. She is moss green and wears pigtails that tend to fly up when she yells. She constantly squints her eyes for emphasis. She spends her time reading magazines and tormenting the other children in her school with her monstrous creations. She uses her dangerous fiends to get what she wants, such as her constant assistant Grudge who helps her give out physical punishment. She develops a one-sided rivalry with Charlotte, and often attempts to kill her. Vendetta almost always uses fiends for her attempts, but she has also done methods like tricking Charlotte into wearing concrete shoes and walking off the edge of a pier. She despises music, to the point of being hurt by it. Her diet consists of almost entirely beef jerky, clams, and grape punch. She speaks in a thick Bulgarian accent and has somewhat broken English. Vendetta appeared in every episode except for episode 14.

Charlotte: (Voiced by Amy Winfrey) A baby blue, optimistic little girl from Vermont. She has curly hair and wears a hairbow. Charlotte believes that all creatures are cute and harmless, and everyone is a potential friend. She tries to find the best in any person or situation, and ignores anything she finds strange. She is convinced that Vendetta is her new best friend, much to Vendetta's chagrin. Charlotte's naivete and oblivious invulnerability results in many of Vendetta's plans for torment to backfire. Vendetta seeks to kill Charlotte, but is never successful. A running gag is that Charlotte sees projectiles thrown at her as gifts. Almost every episode includes her singing a song that she makes up on the spot. Charlotte has the uncanny ability to hold her breath for nine hours. She has a hamster named Buttons. Charlotte is the only character present in every web episode.

Grudge: (Voiced by Peter Merryman) Vendetta's giant hamster fiend, mistaken for a bear by Charlotte and a dog by Mrs. Minty. Grudge does not speak, but rather grunts and growls, and is Vendetta's constant sidekick. He assists Vendetta in making fiends and giving threats to those who defy her. Vendetta almost never refers to him by name, simply calling him "hamster". Unlike most other fiends, he seems to actually care for Vendetta and her safety, despite her harsh treatment of him. Like Rubella and the cat fiend, he is also capable of eating inedible objects. In episode 18, Grudge is replaced by Rubella. In episode 20, Vendetta takes Grudge back after he protects her from rogue fiends.

Mr. Milk: (Voiced by Peter Merryman) The teacher of Charlotte's class. He is a beige, nearly bald man with a tie and glasses whose few remaining hairs stick up when he is scared or surprised. He speaks in a nervous, disjointed monotone due to Vendetta's domination, and is forced to do Vendetta's bidding out of fear of her. He is also afraid of the fanged red bird fiend that is constantly glaring at him. Mr. Milk is probably inspired by Caspar Milquetoast, a comic book character remarkably similar to him. He also physically resembles South Park's Herbert Garrison, notable because Amy Winfrey worked on the first few episodes of South Park. He has a tenor singing voice.

Marion: (Voiced by Amy Winfrey) A pale blue, overweight girl who sits next to Charlotte and speaks in a nasal whisper. She has a collection of glass animals, and has many allergies. A cowardly girl, she was the first student to talk to Charlotte and warn her about Vendetta. She appears to be friends with Malachi, and her DVD commentary implies that she has a crush on Marvin.

Malachi: (Voiced by Peter Merryman) A grey boy who follows Charlotte around school, giving her dire cautions about Vendetta and her fiends, which Charlotte does not understand and ignores. He is a Puritan; he speaks in complicated, archaic English and refuses to sing because it is blasphemous.

Marvin: (Voiced by Peter Merryman) A taller, dark green boy who almost always starts his sentences with "my", usually because his belongings are stolen from him, but also as a verbal tic. Once an episode, he will exclaim "My [possession]!". He is very unlucky, slow and weak. According to a DVD commentary, he brought a banana to show and tell because his dad works at the banana factory.

Maggie: (Voiced by Amy Winfrey) A grey girl who sits next to Marvin and doesn't speak until episode 14, when she cogently remarks, "Charlotte's dumb". In the background, she is seen writing.

Rubella: (Voiced by Elissa Calfin) Vendetta's replacement fiend sidekick. She is a giant doll who resembles Frankenstein's monster. She eats non-edible food (like wood, glass and plaster) and talks in one- and two-word sentences. She is named after a disease of the same name. She thinks of Vendetta as her friend rather than boss, and gave her a musical toy bear, which angered Vendetta and let her to abandonment.

Giant Kitty: (Voiced by Amy Winfrey) Also called "Hellcat". A giant red cat fiend, and the first fiend to appear in the web cartoon. He often attacks the students when they're outside, and has an immense appetite, able to eat anything that will fit in his stomach. He is temporarily tamed by Charlotte, where Charlotte brushes and cares for him, although he gets angry again when Charlotte says he needs a bath.

Buttons: Charlotte's pet hamster, her "favorite hamster in the whole world", first seen in episode 2. He is known for making a high-pitched noise at the sign of any danger.

Scissor fiend: A fiend Vendetta made for Charlotte that resembles a bird and can cut things with its scissorlike beak. Charlotte thinks it's a puppy, and it ends up being her friend instead of killing her. It has a talent for making Valentines. It tries to rescue Charlotte even in the most dangerous situations. In the TV series, Charlotte names it Buttons 2.

Mrs. Minty: (Voiced by Peter Merryman) A substitute teacher. She is an elderly woman who, true to her name, is mint green. She refers to the classmates as "buttercups", "ducklings", and other diminutive terms of endearment. She seems to be unaware of Vendetta's reputation and abilities, not unlike Charlotte. Her main debut is in episode 9, and she is also seen in episodes 20 and 21, but does not talk.

Mort: A blue boy with glasses that was seen in episode 19, being picked up by an ice cream fiend. He is added as another student in Mr. Milk's classroom in the TV series.

Other recurring characters include the Mrs. Millet the lunch lady, and the red frog-like fiend on the lunch counter that controls her. There are also other grey, unnamed students, a girl with clips in her hair that is often seen screaming and waving her arms, and a boy with a baseball cap, both of which are in the classroom next to Vendetta's.

Series overview

Episodes

Season 1: 2003–04

Season 2: 2004–05

Extras and specials

Games
 Halloween Treat (Released October 25th, 2004)
A flash game that is put on the website on Halloween. Unlike the Christmas Bonus and Thanksgiving Treat, its URL is not available on the official website year-round, although it can be played here (renamed Pumpkin Plunkin on Nick.com). At the beginning of the game, the rules are explained by both Charlotte and Vendetta. The overall objective is to throw pumpkins at Charlotte while she moves around the screen in various costumes. The maximum is 30 and there are different end screens depending on how any pumpkins you throw at Charlotte.

DVD Releases
The Season One DVD was first shipped out on December 10, 2004.

The Season Two DVD was first shipped out on December 14, 2005.

In 2006, 2008, 2009 and 2010, a message was posted on the front page saying that a fiend was to be temporarily placed in charge of the site. On April Fool's Day, the main menu had a bite taken out of it, and the fiend was there to explain that he got hungry and ate some episodes, but fixed them.
As a result, 
the episodes 4, 6, 11, 18, 19, and 20 were replaced with their alternate DVD versions as an April Fool's joke.

Broadcast on TurboNick
Nickelodeon bought the series and did a successful test run of Making Fiends on its Web-based TurboNick. Few restrictions were made by the network execs when they made the deal, they told Amy Winfrey, "Just don't mention Hitler, and don't hit people on the head".

Winfrey conceded to a few small changes. For example, a classroom poster that read "A is for Alimony" had to be changed. She was stumped for a while on what A should be for. Aglaia would pop into Winfrey's office and suggest things, such as Alcoholism. They settled on "A is for Abomination".
On October 7, 2007 to April 26, 2009, Nickelodeon aired the web series as Interstitial shorts part of the promotion of the TV Series as it was packaged at the end of ChalkZone and My Life as a Teenage Robot, on October 26, 2009 to January 16, 2010 the shorts were part of  4 events (including Shriek Week, Bigger Badder Saturday, Happy New Premieres! and Super Strange Saturday) and the Nicktoons programming block on Nickelodeon, the 7 episodes that air was previously on TurboNick and the Valentine's Day episode air on Nicktoons.

See also
 Amy Winfrey
 Lenore, the Cute Little Dead Girl
 Salad Fingers
 TV series
 List of characters

References

External links
Making Fiends
Muffin Films (another series by Amy Winfrey)
Big Bunny (also by Amy Winfrey)

2003 web series debuts
2005 web series endings
American children's animated comic science fiction television series
American children's animated science fantasy television series
American children's animated horror television series
American flash animated web series
Animated television series about children
Making Fiends
Webtoons